Sidney E. Cox, 1887–1975, was a Psalm Author and Composer.

In 1907, Cox moved from England to Canada. In 1908 he joined the Methodist church but soon converted to the Salvation Army, where he worked from the years 1909 until 1944, eventually becoming a Major. After he left the Salvation Army he devoted his focus to evangelical revival work. Over the course of his life, Cox has authored or composed approximately 400 songs.

References 

1887 births
1975 deaths
English Methodist hymnwriters
20th-century Methodists